Pericapritermes ceylonicus, is a species of small termite of the genus Pericapritermes. It is found in Sri Lanka and India.

References

Termites
Insects described in 1911